Evin Ahmad (born ) is a Kurdish-Swedish actress and author.

Early life
Elvin Ahmad was born on 8 June 1990 in Stockholm, Sweden.
Her parents are Kurds. Her father is an actor from Sulaymaniyah in Iraq and her mother is from Afrin in Syria. She grew up in Akalla, Stockholm where she lived for 22 years.

Career
Evin Ahmad has studied at Stockholm Academy of Dramatic Arts.

Filmography

References

External links

Swedish people of Kurdish descent
21st-century Swedish actresses
1990 births
Actresses from Stockholm
Living people